The Barsuki Desert is a desert zone in the Aktobe and Kyzylorda regions of Kazakhstan. It has two parts, the Greater Barsuki in the west and the Lesser Barsuki in the east.

The sands of the deserts are the result of the weathering of Paleogene rocks; only the northern section of the Greater Barsuki was formed from more recent alluvial deposits.

Geography
The Barsuki are roughly aligned in a SSW - NNE direction. They are located at the southern end of the Turgay Depression, stretching from the northern coast of the Aral Sea in the Kyzylorda Region to the southeastern sector of the Aktobe Region. The area is sandy and receives very little rainfall. The sands are subject to eolic action, forming mounds, ridges and dunes.

Greater Barsuki
It stretches from the area southeast of Begimbet in the south to a little to the northeast of Shalkar town.

Lesser Barsuki

Flora
The vegetation of the flat areas consists mainly of xerophytic shrubs, including wormwood, saltwort and ephemeral plants. In the slopes of hills and ridges there are thickets of dzhuzgun, sand acacia, astragalus, kandym and chingil.

See also
 Geography of Kazakhstan

References

External links

Deserts of the North Aral Sea.

Deserts of Central Asia
Deserts of Kazakhstan
Geography of Aktobe Region
Kyzylorda Region